Robert Nicholas Street (born 26 September 2001) is an English professional footballer who plays as a striker for Shrewsbury Town, on loan from Crystal Palace.

Career
Born in Oxford, Street began his career with Crystal Palace, turning professional in summer 2020. He joined Torquay United on loan in January 2021. In January 2022 Street joined Newport County on loan for the remainder of the 2021–22 season. He made his debut for Newport on 29 January 2022 as a second-half substitute in the 2–1 League Two win against Barrow. Street scored his first goal for Newport in the 2–0 League Two win against Stevenage on 12 March 2022.

He joined Shrewsbury Town on loan in September 2022.

References

External links

2001 births
Living people
Footballers from Oxford
English footballers
Crystal Palace F.C. players
Torquay United F.C. players
Newport County A.F.C. players
Shrewsbury Town F.C. players
National League (English football) players
English Football League players
Association football forwards